The list of ship decommissionings in 1995 includes a chronological list of all ships decommissioned in 1995.


See also 

1995
 Ship decommissionings
Ship